George Lyall (1819 – 12 October 1881) was a British Conservative politician.

Lyall was first elected Conservative MP for Whitehaven at a by-election in 1857—caused by the death of Robert Hildyard—and held the seat until 1865 when he stood down.

References

External links
 

Conservative Party (UK) MPs for English constituencies
UK MPs 1857–1859
UK MPs 1859–1865
1819 births
1881 deaths